Lauratonematidae is a family of nematodes belonging to the order Enoplida.

Genera:
 Lauratonema Gerlach, 1953
 Lauratonemella Chesunov, 1984
 Lauratonemoides De Coninck, 1965

References

Nematode families